Marmaroxena is a genus of moths belonging to the family Tineidae. It contains only one species, Marmaroxena autochalca, which is found on Samoa.

References

Tineidae
Monotypic moth genera
Moths of Oceania
Tineidae genera
Taxa named by Edward Meyrick